Saros cycle series 155 for solar eclipses occurs at the Moon's ascending node, repeating every 18 years, 11 days. Saros 155 contains 71 events in which of 15 will be partial solar eclipses and other 56 are umbral. There are 60 solar eclipses before 3000 AD. All eclipses in this series occurs at the Moon's ascending node.

This solar saros is linked to Lunar Saros 148.

Total number of eclipses: 71

Total duration: 1262 years

Number of eclipses: 71

Number of eclipses (partial): 15

Member 
It contains 71 member events.

Total duration: 1262 years

Umbral eclipses
Umbral eclipses (annular, total and hybrid) can be further classified as either: 1) Central (two limits), 2) Central (one limit) or 3) Non-Central (one limit). The statistical distribution of these classes in Saros series 155 appears in the following table.

Events

References 
 http://eclipse.gsfc.nasa.gov/SEsaros/SEsaros155.html

External links
Saros cycle 155 - Information and visualization

Solar saros series